

References 

Activision Value